The Philippine Basketball Association (PBA) Defensive Player of the Year is an annual Philippine Basketball Association (PBA) award given since the 1993 PBA season to the top defensive player of the season.  Unlike the traditional player awards, which is given by the league, this citation is awarded by the PBA Press Corps.

Since its inception, the award has been given to 19 individuals. The most recent award winner is Arwind Santos of the NorthPort Batang Pier.

Winners

Multiple time winners

Notes

References

Defensive Player of the Year
Awards established in 1993
1993 establishments in the Philippines